Gustavo Chapela (born 8 September 1946) is a Mexican fencer. He competed in the individual and team sabre and team foil events at the 1968 Summer Olympics.

References

External links
 

1946 births
Living people
Mexican male sabre fencers
Olympic fencers of Mexico
Fencers at the 1968 Summer Olympics
Fencers from Mexico City
Pan American Games medalists in fencing
Pan American Games bronze medalists for Mexico
Fencers at the 1971 Pan American Games
Mexican male foil fencers
21st-century Mexican people
20th-century Mexican people